Edwin Jesse DeHaven (May 7, 1816May 1, 1865) was a United States Navy officer and explorer of the first half of the 19th century who was best known for his command of the First Grinnell expedition in 1850, which was directed to ascertain what had happened to the lost Franklin Polar Expedition.

Life
Born in Philadelphia on May 7, 1816, De Haven became a midshipman at the age of 10, serving until 1857. From 1839 to 1842, he participated in the Wilkes Expedition, officially known as the United States Exploring Expedition.

His most notable achievement was serving as captain of the Advance. Together with Rescue, the ship participated in the Arctic search mission to discover the remains of John Franklin's earlier, 1847, Arctic expedition. The two ships left New York on May 5, 1850. De Haven and his crew were at sea for sixteen months, spending the winter inside the Arctic circle.

After returning from the expedition, Edwin Jesse De Haven served in the U.S. Coast Survey, before spending the rest of his career at the United States Naval Observatory under superintendent Matthew Fontaine Maury. 

Suffering from impaired vision, he was placed on the retired list in 1862. He died in Philadelphia May 1, 1865, and was interred at that city's Christ Church Burial Ground.

Namesakes
The United States Navy named two destroyers USS De Haven in his honor.

See also

References

The Royal Navy in Polar Exploration from Franklin to Scott, E C Coleman, 2006 (Tempus Publishing)

External links
Biography of De Haven from the Dictionary of American Naval Fighting Ships, U.S. Naval Historical Center
Biography at the Dictionary of Canadian Biography Online
 See an 1858 map Preliminary chart of entrance to Brazos River, Texas / from a trigonometrical survey under the direction of A. Bache; triangulation by J.S. Williams ; topography by J.M. Wampler; hydrography by the parties under the command of E.J. De Haven & J.K. Duer., hosted by the Portal to Texas History.
Edwin Jesse De Haven Papers, 1832-1928 MS 211 held by Special Collection & Archives, Nimitz Library at the United States Naval Academy

1816 births
1865 deaths
Explorers of Canada
Explorers of the Arctic
Military personnel from Philadelphia
United States Navy officers
Burials at Christ Church, Philadelphia